Huddersfield Town's 1926-27 campaign was a season which saw the team lose their English league title by five points to Newcastle United after winning it for the previous 3 seasons.

Squad at the start of the season

Review
Town were on top of the world following their 3rd consecutive 1st Division championship. Town's season was a very successful season in the league, although they had as many draws as wins during the season, which probably cost them their chances of their 4th consecutive title, although they were only one point off Newcastle United after beating them on Easter Tuesday, but their last 3 games produced 0-0 draws against Manchester United and Aston Villa at Leeds Road along with a 4-0 defeat at Burnden Park against Bolton Wanderers. That meant Town finished 5 points behind Newcastle at the end of the season.

Squad at the end of the season

Results

Division One

FA Cup

Appearances and goals

Huddersfield Town A.F.C. seasons
Huddersfield Town F.C.